is a retractable roof, multi-purpose stadium in the city of Ōita in Ōita Prefecture on Kyushu Island in Japan.

The stadium will be called  from 1 January 2023 as an abbreviated form, by naming rights. It is primarily used for football, and is the home field of J. League club Oita Trinita. It was designed by the famous architect Kisho Kurokawa, and built by KT Group, Takenaka Corporation.

History

Oita Stadium opened in May 2001 and originally had a capacity of 43,000. But after 2002 FIFA World Cup ended, 3,000 movable seats on the track were removed, so its current capacity is 40,000 .

Major sports matches

2002 FIFA World Cup

2019 Rugby World Cup

Features 
Ōita Stadium has a retractable dome roof with roof system driven by a wire traction system. Other features of the stadium:

 Building area: 51,830 m²
 Total floor area: 92,882 m²
 Covered area: 29,000 m²
 Stand inclination: Max. 33 degree angle

See also

 Sapporo Dome in Sapporo, Hokkaido Prefecture
 Home's Stadium Kobe in Kobe, Hyogo Prefecture
Big, Bigger, Biggest - a documentary TV series featuring the stadium

References

External links

Dome - Oita Sports Park 
Big Bigger Biggest program featured the Ōita Bank Dome (50:10, YouTube video)

Sports venues completed in 2001
2002 FIFA World Cup stadiums in Japan
Retractable-roof stadiums in Japan
Football venues in Japan
Rugby union stadiums in Japan
Ōita (city)
Sports venues in Ōita Prefecture
Athletics (track and field) venues in Japan
Oita Trinita
Multi-purpose stadiums in Japan
2001 establishments in Japan